Tayo Popoola is an English musician and DJ.

History
He released his first Y4K compilation in 2000.

Tayo worked with artists including Acid Rockers, Freq Nasty, Care In The Community, Baobinga, Control Z and Sunz Of Mecha. He has released tracks for labels such as Skint Records, Fat, Mantra Breaks, Functional Breaks, Bassrock and Passenger as well as engaging in remix work for artists such as Jaydee and Dave Clark.

From 2004 onwards, Tayo has been a resident DJ at clubs and venues throughout the UK, including Fabric, The End and Ministry of Sound.

Tayo makes regular appearances on an Arsenal fans podcast called 'The Tuesday Club' alongside comedians Alan Davies, Ian Stone and Keith Dover, and Damian Harris.

Discography

Releases
Y4K – Tayo (CD)Distinct've Breaks 2000
 Y4K Summer Breaks (CD)  DJ Magazine  2002
 Y4K → Tayo – Next Level Breaks (Dread At The Controls) (2xCD)  Distinct'ive Breaks Records  2003
 Beats n Bobs vol. 3 (CD)Functional Breaks 2006
 Reality Dub (12")  Bassrock Records  2006
 Wildlife Dub / Down Under Dub (12")  777 Records  2006
 Every Time / Lovers Rock (12")  Mantra Breaks, Mantra Vibes  2007
 FabricLive. 32 (CD)  Fabric (London)  2007
 TAYO meets CTRL Z (12") Mantra Breaks Italy 2007
 Tayo meets Acid Rockers (12") Dread Cowboy (Soul Jazz Records) 2008
 Tayo meets Baobinga (12") Style & Trend (Soul Jazz Records) 2008
 Tayo meets Acid Rockers feat. Pupajim – Vampayaa (Scrub A Dub Records) 2010

Remixes
 House Nation 219 (12") The Hymn (Tayo's MMM S... DMC  2001
 Fly Life (Remixes Part 2) (12") Fly Life (Tayo & The U... Atlantic Jaxx  2006
 Give Love (12") Give Love (Tayo & Care... Functional Breaks  2006
 Lunacy (12", Promo) Lunacy (Tayo & The Und... EMI Records (UK)  2006
 Ben Ononono (10") Count To Ten (Tayo Remix) 2007
Transglobal Underground (12") Dancehall Operator (Tayo remix) 2007

Production
 Club Island Summer 2003 (3xCD) Wicked Dub Virgin Records (UK), Virgin Records (UK)  2003

DJ mixes
 Tayo Presents "Planet Of The Breakz" (CD)  Dust 2 Dust Records  1999
 Nu Horizons: The Next Generation of Breaks v03 (CD)  StreetBeat Records  2001
 Y4K: Tayo / Further Still (CD)  Distinct'ive Breaks Records  2001
 Mob Deep Volume 01.Tayo (CD)  Mob Records  2003
 Y4K → Tayo – Next Level Breaks (Dread At The Controls) (2xCD)  Distinct'ive Breaks Records  2003
 Tayo – Beatz & Bobz Volume 3 (CD)  Functional Breaks  2004
 Tayo: These Are The Breaks (CD)  DMC  2006
 FabricLive. 32 (CD) – Tayo,   Fabric (London)  2007

Appears on
 Renaissance Presents... Volume Two (2xCD) Fraction Of Friction Renaissance  1998
 Fraction Of Friction (12")  Ultimatum Breaks  1999
 Ride The Funky (12")  Thursday Club Recordings (TCR)  1999
 Y4K: Tayo / Further Still (2xLP)  Distinct'ive Breaks Records  2001
 Mob Deep Volume 01.Tayo (3xLP)  Mob Records  2003
 Rocker's Delight (12")  Fat! Records  2005
 Breakbeat Bass Vol 2 (CD) Wildlife Dub Passenger  2006

Tracks appear on
 On A Mission (CD) Fire Good (Rennie Pilg... Muve Recordings  2002
 Ali B Presents Air Breaks (CD, Promo) Reality Dub Air Recordings  2006
 Ali B Presents... Air (CD) Reality Dub Air Recordings  2006
 Breakbeat Bass Vol 2 (CD) Wildlife Dub Passenger  2006
 Breakspoll Presents: Volume 2 (CD) Lovers Rock Super Charged  2006
 Tayo: These Are The Breaks (CD) Wildlife Dub, Every Ti... DMC  2006
 Teamplayers (CD, Album) Looking For A Session Passenger  2006
 Teamplayers EP (CDr, Promo) Looking For A Session Passenger  2006
 Teamplayers EP (2x12") Looking For A Session Passenger  2006

References

Living people
Year of birth missing (living people)
People educated at Christ's Hospital
Musicians from London
Electronica musicians
English DJs
English record producers
English people of Yoruba descent
Yoruba musicians